This is a list of Royal Navy ratings rank insignia.

Insignia

Royal Navy

Royal Marines

Trade (branch) badges
Ratings in the Royal Navy include trade badges on the right sleeve to indicate a specific job. The information on the left arm is the individual's rate - e.g. a leading rate (commonly called a leading hand). One nickname is "Killick", for the Killick-anchor rate badge. Branch badges include stars and crowns above and below the branch logo, indicating an individual's qualification within their branch. 
One star indicates they have passed the required exam in order to be eligible to be selected for the Leading Rates course in their respective branch. Two stars indicates they have completed the Leading Rates course and are now eligible to study for the Petty Officers Qualifying Exam (PQE). A crown indicates they have passed the relevant PQE and are eligible to be Petty Officer.
The insignia denotes trade and specialty.

Branches and specialities
Trades in the Royal Navy are listed below. Branch sub-specialities are denoted with an abbreviation on the branch badge. Ratings in the Marine Engineering and Medical branches may obtain "Dolphins" (qualify for the Royal Navy Submarine Service). Some personnel have an additional option to pass the All Arms Commando Course and serve attached to the Royal Marines. The branches were reviewed, revised and published in the Royal Navy's June 2013 BR3 (Book of Reference) edition (now the June 2015 edition).

Engineering

Logistics

Medical

Warfare

Current (since 1975)

1951–1975
The Seaman and Naval Airman branches were:

Leading rates qualified as instructors in the following branches:
 Radar plot
 Torpedo anti-Submarine,
 Gunnery
 Physical training
 Tactical communication
 Radio communication

The instructor rate began to disappear in 1972, when fleet chief petty officers (warrant officers) were introduced.

Other branches, including Naval Air Mechanics, were:
Basic device: Junior or Basic Technical qualification
Basic device with star above: Technical qualification for able rate
Basic device with star above and star below: Technical qualification for leading rate*
Basic device with crown above: Petty officer qualified for higher rate of pay
Basic device with crown above: Chief petty officer qualified for lower rate of pay
Basic device with crown above star below: Chief petty officer qualified for higher rate of pay

.*not applicable to Coder, Supply and Secretariat, Artisan and Sick Birth Branches

Before 1947, each branch developed its own device badges and the crowns and 
stars of one branch did not necessarily have the same meaning as another. In 1948 and 1951, reforms were implemented to bring the branches into line with each other. A star above the badge normally indicates a person of superior qualifications, and another star below 
denotes that the person has passed for (and is performing) specific duties; e.g. gunnery, captain of turret, torpedo, torpedo-boat coxswain or signals. The crown is the emblem of authority, and is common in most petty officer, CPO, instructor and police badges.

Warrant officers and above do not wear branch badges.  Until the late 1990s, artificer apprentices and leading artificers wore the same uniform as petty officers (with a red beret or cap badge, similar to a petty officer's). Apprentices were the last junior ratings not to be dressed as seamen; they did not wear "square rig".

History

In 1879 Chief Petty Officers received a fore-and-aft uniform similar to that of the officers, with a cap badge of an anchor within a cord
surmounted by a crown. In 1890, they ceased to wear an arm badge. In 1913, the rank of Petty Officer 2nd Class was abolished but the other
badges remained the same.

In 1920, petty officers with four years' standing also received the fore-and-aft rig with the cap badge formerly worn by CPOs. The CPOs added a wreath to their cap badge, making it similar to the earlier arm badge.

In 1970 a new rank of Fleet chief petty officer was introduced, with insignia of the royal coat of arms on the lower arm (identical to a warrant officer class 1 in the army and RAF, to which the new rank was equivalent). This rank was renamed warrant officer, and then warrant officer class 1.

In 2004 the rank of warrant officer class 2 was formed from those CPOs holding the appointment of charge chief petty officer. The insignia is a crown within a wreath, also worn on the lower arm. The badges are now worn on the shoulders of 3A/B and 4A/B. Chevrons on the left sleeve, below the rank badge, are for long service and good conduct (one for each four-year period; no more than three may be worn). A chief petty officer in the blue uniform wears three buttons on their sleeves to indicate rank, the same rank insignia (but topped with a star) used by Chilean Navy midshipmen. The WO2 rank began to be phased out in April 2014 for most branches except Submariner engineers, with no new appointments; existing holders of the rank retain it until they are promoted or leave the service. It now has been re-instated due to the Navy Command Transformation Programme.

Royal Marines band service

See also
British Army other ranks rank insignia
RAF other ranks
Ranks and insignia of NATO navies enlisted
Ranks of the cadet forces of the United Kingdom
Royal Navy officer rank insignia
Royal Marines Band Service#Insignia, ranks and uniform
Uniforms of the Royal Marines

Notes

References

External links
Royal Navy BR 3(1) Part 8
Royal Navy ranks, professions, trades and badges of rank in World War 2

British military insignia